Kazakhstan first competed at the  Deaflympics for the first time in 1997. Kazakhstan claimed their first Deaflympic medal in their first Deaflympic experience and finished with 2 medals in the event. So far, Kazakhstan has managed to bag 8 medals in the event's history.

Kazakhstan also participated in the 2015 Winter Deaflympics, which is also the only Winter Deaflympics event where Kazakhstan was eligible to participate.

Medal tallies

Summer Deaflympics

Winter Deaflympics

Medals

Source:

Medals by Summer Games

Medals by Winter Games

See also 
 Kazakhstan at the Olympics
 Kazakhstan at the Paralympics

References 

Nations at the Deaflympics
D
Deaf culture in Kazakhstan